Democratic Force (FD) was a centrist political party in France founded in 1995 by the merger between the centrist components of the Union for French Democracy (UDF): the Christian-democratic Centre of Social Democrats and the Social Democratic Party.

The party disappeared in 1998, when the UDF confederation became a unified political party. The former leader of Democratic Force, François Bayrou, became president of this party, and more recently leader of the UDF's successor party, the Democratic Movement. However, a big chunk of FD's former members have later sided with the Union of the Popular Movement and The Republicans, as well as the Democratic European Force, formed by a splinter group from New Centre led by Jean-Christophe Lagarde and later aligned with the Union of Democrats and Independents, of which Lagarde is the current leader.

Political parties of the French Fifth Republic
1995 establishments in France
Political parties established in 1995
Union for French Democracy breakaway groups